Mother's Day is a 1989 American crime drama television film directed and produced by Susan Rohrer. The film follows a determined mother (played by Denise Nicholas) who battles a stacked deck of evidence incriminating her 19-year-old son (played by Malcolm-Jamal Warner) in the drug-related killing. It is the CBN Family Channel's first television film.

References

External links
 
 

1989 films
1989 television films
1989 crime drama films
1980s mystery drama films
American films based on actual events
American crime drama films
American mystery drama films
American courtroom films
American detective films
Crime television films
American drama television films
Films about Christianity
Films about drugs
Films about murder
Films about miscarriage of justice
Films shot in Virginia
Melodrama films
Mother's Day
Films about mother–son relationships
Murder mystery films
Crime films based on actual events
Drama films based on actual events
Television films based on actual events
Freeform (TV channel) original programming
1980s English-language films
1980s American films